Podberezinsky District was a district (raion) of the Tatar ASSR.

It had an area of about 524 square kilometers in 1947 and was divided into 16 selsoviets.

It was established on February 19, 1944. Its administrative center was the village (selo) of Bolshoye Podberezye. On May 14, 1956, the district was abolished and its territory was transferred to Kaybitsky District.

References

History of Tatarstan
States and territories established in 1944
States and territories disestablished in 1956